Meola Glacier  or Athasi-Balati Glacier is the Himalayan glacier situated in the eastern part of Uttarakhand in the Pithoragarh district of India.

Geography 
Meola Glacier is located at the base of the five peaks of Panchchuli in the Lassar Yankti valley.

The Meola Glacier combines with the Saun Glacier to form the famous Panchchuli Glacier. Sona and Meola glaciers serve as the route to climb the Panchchuli peaks from the east. Saun glacier is situated north to Meola glacier. The snout of the Meola glacier is a one-hour trek along Duktu Nala from Duktu village. This place also serves as base camp for Panchchuli expeditions. Meola glacier is divided into lower and upper parts.

See also
 List of glaciers
 Sona Glacier

References 

Glaciers of Uttarakhand
Geography of Pithoragarh district